Crash My Party is the fourth studio album by American country music artist Luke Bryan. It was released on August 13, 2013, by Capitol Records Nashville. Its first single, the title track, reached number one on the Billboard Country Airplay chart. The album was produced by Jeff Stevens. A deluxe edition with four bonus tracks is available digitally or by exclusive Target and Walmart CDs.

Even though the reception towards the album by music critics was mixed, the album has seen remarkably high commercial success. On its first week, the album sold 528,000 copies and debuted at number one on both the Billboard 200, Bryan's first album to do so on that chart, and Top Country Albums charts. It was certified Platinum by the RIAA on September 30, 2013, and became the third best-selling album of 2013. By July 2014, the album had reached over 2 million in sales in the United States.

Critical reception

Crash My Party garnered mixed reception from music critics. At Metacritic, they assign a weighted average score to ratings and reviews from selected mainstream critics, which based upon six reviews, the album has a Metascore of 56.

At Rolling Stone, Chuck Eddy felt that "Given the drinking songs he's best at, he'd be better off pretending spring break lasts all year long" because he cannot seem to match up to "Kenny Chesney's knack for lonely contemplation." Stephen Thomas Erlewine at AllMusic told that some of the tracks "seem slightly cookie-cutter", yet at the same time "he does seem savvy," and "somebody who embraces what real redneck living is about in 2013." At The Boston Globe, Sarah Rodman gave the album a mixed review, and wrote that the album sounds somewhat generic "But the majority of the record is given over to 'Party' games we've heard Bryan [...] and many others in contemporary country [...] play before." Eric Allen of American Songwriter noted how "Crash My Party is melodiously rewarding despite its sporadic lyrical missteps." At Music Is My Oxygen, Rob Burkhardt felt that Bryan "chose to coast on that momentum" from his previous album.

At USA Today, Jerry Shriver highlighted that in comparison to his last album this has a "slightly more generic-sounding" tone, and he wrote that Bryan "comes across as just another backwoods party animal with an amped-up sound and indiscriminate taste in women." At The Oakland Press, Gary Graff felt that the release was yet "another mostly upbeat and good-humored set, which, more than anything else, demonstrates Bryan's and producer Jeff Stevens' knack for picking out exactly the right songs for the singer to record." Melinda Newman of HitFix alluded to how the release "will be a nice new chapter in a pleasingly familiar book, if not a particularly high-octane one." At Country Weekly, Joseph Hudak told that "All the imagery his fans have come to demand is there", however "In the future, it'd be nice to see Luke, the reigning ACM Entertainer of the Year, grow out of the fields he's so clearly comfortable in."

Billy Dukes of Taste of Country felt that "there is little to differentiate the two projects", which this may lead some people to "line up to pigeonhole him", and noted that "There are hits to be found on his fourth studio album, but a lack of powerful album cuts makes the project much less exciting than one would like." At Newsday, Glenn Gamboa called Bryan "a singles hitter [...] in more ways than one", which means that he felt "Bryan never hits a home run, but he sure does connect a lot." They also continue on to say that "every time he tries to swing for the fences, he strikes out." Matt Bjorke of Roughstock evoked that "Crash My Party clearly features melodies and ideas that come from outside of Country's traditions, nobody would mistake the album for anything but a Country Music album, a strong, well-made modern one which makes times to nod to tradition while still looking forward."

Commercial performance
Crash My Party sold over 528,000 copies during its first week of release. In 2013, it became the fourth best-selling album in its debut week, with the only albums to achieve better first week sales being Justin Timberlake's The 20/20 Experience, Eminem's The Marshall Mathers LP 2, Jay Z's Magna Carta... Holy Grail, and Drake's Nothing Was the Same. Any album by a male country music artist has not been sold this well in nine years. For the week of August 31, 2013, the album reached number one on both the Billboard 200 and Top Country Albums charts. As a result, this became Bryan's second number one album that year. The album's title track climbed the charts and reached number 2 on Hot Country Songs. The next week, the album broke the record for the largest second-week percentage sales drop for a number-one debuting album of the Nielsen SoundScan era.

Crash My Party became the third best-selling album of 2013 in the United States with over 1,521,000 copies sold that year. In 2014, the album sold an additional 754,000 copies, and it reached its two million sales mark in July 2014. In May 2015, the album surpassed the total in sales of Bryan's previous album (2011's Tailgates & Tanlines) to become his best-selling album to date. As of July 2017, the album has sold over 2.7 million copies in the United States.

Track listing

Personnel

Mike Brignardello – bass guitar
Luke Bryan – lead vocals
Tom Bukovac – acoustic guitar, electric guitar
Perry Coleman – background vocals
J. T. Corenflos – e-bow, electric guitar
Eric Darken – percussion
Shannon Forrest – drums
Kenny Greenberg – e-bow, electric guitar
Tania Hancheroff – background vocals
Mike Johnson – pedal steel guitar

Charlie Judge – synthesizer
Greg Morrow – drums
Russ Pahl – pedal steel guitar
Mike Rojas – Fender Rhodes, Hammond B-3 organ, piano, synthesizer
Jimmie Lee Sloas – bass guitar
Joe Spivey – bouzouki, fiddle
Chris Stapleton – background vocals on “Drink A Beer”
Jody Stevens – programming
Ilya Toshinsky – acoustic guitar
Jennifer Wrinkle – background vocals

Charts

Weekly charts

Year-end charts

Decade-end charts

Certifications

References

2013 albums
Capitol Records Nashville albums
Canadian Country Music Association Top Selling Album albums 
Luke Bryan albums